Liam Dominic Byrne (born 2 October 1970) is a British politician serving as the Member of Parliament (MP) for Birmingham Hodge Hill since 2004. A member of the Labour Party, he served in Prime Minister Gordon Brown’s Cabinet from 2008 to 2010.

Byrne served in the Home Office under Prime Minister Tony Blair as Minister for Police and Counter-terrorism (2006) and Minister for Borders and Immigration (2006–08). He served in Prime Minister Gordon Brown’s Cabinet as Minister for the Cabinet Office and Chancellor of the Duchy of Lancaster from 2008 to 2009. He deputised for Chancellor Alistair Darling at HM Treasury as Chief Secretary to the Treasury from 2009 to 2010. Upon his departure as Chief Secretary to the Treasury, he notoriously left a note for his successor which read "I'm afraid there is no money".

In opposition, he attended Ed Miliband's Shadow Cabinet as Shadow Chief Secretary to the Treasury (2010), Shadow Minister for the Cabinet Office (2010–11) and Shadow Secretary of State for Work and Pensions (2011–13). Following his demotion in 2013, Byrne continued to serve in junior shadow ministerial roles under Miliband and later Jeremy Corbyn.

Byrne was the Labour candidate for the Mayor of the West Midlands in the 2021 mayoral election, where he lost to the Conservative incumbent Andy Street.

Early life
Byrne was born in Warrington, and was state-educated at Burnt Mill School in Harlow. He completed his A levels at The Hertfordshire and Essex High School in Bishop's Stortford. He then went on to study at the University of Manchester, where he obtained a first-class honours degree in Politics and Modern History, and was elected Communications Officer of the University of Manchester Students' Union. He also holds an MBA from the Harvard Business School at Harvard University, where he was a Fulbright Scholar, graduating with honours.

Before being elected to Parliament, he worked for Accenture and Rothschild & Co, before co-founding a venture-backed technology company, e-Government Solutions Group, in 2000. In 1996/7, he advised the Labour Party on the re-organisation of its Millbank headquarters, and helped lead Labour's business campaign.

Parliamentary career

Early career
He was selected to contest the Birmingham Hodge Hill by-election following the resignation of the veteran Labour MP Terry Davis to become the Secretary General of the Council of Europe. On 15 July 2004, the same day as Labour lost Leicester South in another by-election, Byrne squeaked home with a majority of just 460. The campaign, led by Tom Watson MP, drew criticism from antiracists for its tactics, particularly a Labour leaflet proclaiming "Labour is on your side – the Lib Dems are on the side of failed asylum seekers". Byrne himself said, "I know that people here are worried about fraudulent asylum claims and illegal immigration. Yet the Lib Dems ignore what people say. They ignore what local people really want. The Lib Dems want to keep giving welfare benefits to failed asylum seekers. They voted for this in Parliament on 1 March 2004. They want your money –  and mine –  to go to failed asylum seekers."

Upon election, he made his maiden speech on 22 July 2004 in which he condemned racial hatred.

2005–2010

Following his re-election in 2005, he was appointed Parliamentary Under-Secretary of State for Care Services at the Department of Health led by Secretary of State Patricia Hewitt.

Byrne had been a vocal campaigner for road safety; in 2005, he handed a petition in to Parliament demanding tougher punishments for dangerous drivers. He sat on the parliamentary committee that shaped the Road Safety Act 2006, which increased fixed penalty fines for driving while using a mobile. In November 2007, he was fined £100 and received three points on his driving licence for using his mobile phone while driving.

Following the 2006 local elections, he was promoted to replace Hazel Blears as Minister of State for Policing and Counter-terrorism at the Home Office. However, just a fortnight later Home Secretary John Reid moved him to the immigration role, switching portfolios with Tony McNulty. Byrne's move was seen as an attempt by Reid to reorganise a dysfunctional immigrations system which Byrne completed, as well as establishing UK Border Agency, introduced a points system and developed the idea of earned citizenship. During this period he was also Minister for the West Midlands.

In May 2007, Byrne announced a consultation document which he said was about "trying to create a much more hostile environment in this country if you are here illegally". This eventually led to the controversial Conservative Home Office hostile environment policy. Byrne was promoted in a cabinet reshuffle on 3 October 2008, becoming Minister for the Cabinet Office and Chancellor of the Duchy of Lancaster.

Immigration rules
In November 2006, Byrne was responsible for a change to Immigration Rules preventing migrants who had entered under Britain's Highly Skilled Migrant Programme (HSMP) having their permission to remain in Britain extended, unless they could show both that they had been earning at least £32,000 pa while in Britain and also that they had a good knowledge of English. This change was controversial because it applied retrospectively to immigrants who had entered Britain under the old rules, meaning the British Government had "moved the goalposts"–a degree became effectively an essential requirement, regardless of the skills or economic contribution that an individual could demonstrate.

In their report into the changes, the Parliamentary Joint Committee on Human Rights said that "The changes to the Rules are so clearly incompatible with Article 8, and so contrary to basic notions of fairness, that the case for immediately revisiting the changes to the Rules in Parliament is in our view overwhelming." Appeal cases have been won on appeal on the grounds that applicants had a legitimate expectation that the rules would not change to their detriment. A judicial review was successfully brought against the government, with their actions when applying the new HSMP rules to those HSMP holders already in Britain as at 7 November 2006 being ruled as unlawful.

Byrne is in favour of legislation for a Migration Act, similar to the 1958 immigration law in Australia which is administered by the Department of Immigration and Citizenship (DIAC).

"British Day"
In June 2008, Byrne suggested the "August bank holiday" to be made a weekend of national celebration (a "British Day") in a speech to a New Labour think tank. However, Scotland's August bank holiday is held on a different date from that in Wales and England. He later retracted this – after pressure from the Scottish National Party – saying he was merely trying to "get the debate started".

Since this suggestion, the concept of a British national holiday was raised again by the coalition government, with the Conservative and Liberal Democrat parties suggesting the May Day bank holiday may be moved to October and renamed "UK Day" or associated with the existing Trafalgar Day.

Leaked staffing requirements memo
In November 2008, an 11-page memo written by Byrne entitled "Working With Liam Byrne" was leaked to the press. In the memo, Byrne listed his demands from his staff, memorably including his requirement for a cappuccino on his arrival in the office, soup between 12:30 pm and 1 pm and an espresso at 3 pm. Byrne also instructed officials to tell him "not what you think I should know, but you expect I will get asked." He warns staff that they should "Never put anything to me unless you understand it and can explain it to me in 60 seconds... If I see things that are not of acceptable quality, I will blame you." The Guardian described Byrne as an "eager diva".

Departure from the Treasury
On leaving his position as Chief Secretary to the Treasury following the change of British government in May 2010, Byrne left a note to his successor David Laws saying: "Dear Chief Secretary, I'm afraid there is no money. Kind regards – and good luck! Liam." Byrne later claimed that it was just typical humour between politicians but regretted it since the new government used it to justify the wave of cuts that were introduced. The note echoed Chancellor Reginald Maudling's note to James Callaghan: "Good luck, old cock ... Sorry to leave it in such a mess." after the Conservatives' defeat at the 1964 election.

The note was frequently referenced by the following coalition government of Conservatives and Liberal Democrats to criticise the financial record of the previous Labour government, and used as a visual prop by David Cameron in the Question Time debate preceding the 2015 general election. After the party's election defeat, Byrne stated he had been "burnt with shame" since 2010 over the note which had harmed the 2015 election campaign.

2010–2016 
Following his re-election at the 2010 general election, Byrne was appointed by new Labour leader Ed Miliband to lead Labour's policy review for two years. He was Shadow Secretary of State for Work and Pensions from January 2011 to October 2013. He was sacked after increasing criticism from Labour members and having "badly lost the confidence of the PLP", particularly after allegedly describing the Conservative-led coalition's benefits cap as "too soft, saying that "Ministers have bodged the rules so the cap won't affect Britain's 4,000 largest families and it does nothing to stop people living a life on welfare".

Alongside Chuka Umunna, Byrne made an official visit to Israel in October 2012 as part of the LFI's UK-Israel Economic Dialogue group. Byrne is a member of the Labour Friends of Israel.

Byrne is the chair of the APPG on Inclusive Growth, formed in July 2014 upon the request of the Archbishop of Canterbury, with the aim of finding a new consensus on inclusive growth to ensure the benefits of growth are enjoyed by all sectors of society. He is also chair of the APPG on Children of Alcoholics, which has produced a manifesto in support of the estimated 2.5 million children of alcoholics who live in the UK. Byrne himself was one of these children and set up the APPG after speaking publicly about his father's condition in 2015.

Byrne was shortlisted for the Grassroot Diplomat Initiative Award in 2015 for his work on raising money for charities and remains in the directory of the Grassroot Diplomat Who's Who publication.

He supported Owen Smith in the 2016 Labour Party leadership election.

Candidate for Mayor of the West Midlands 
In February 2020, Byrne won the selection contest as the Labour candidate for the 2021 West Midlands mayoral election.

As part of his campaign he called for the Birmingham 2022 Commonwealth Games to be the "greenest games ever", and pledged to be the first West Midlands Mayor to fill the role of Deputy Mayor with a woman and to revitalise the West Midlands' ailing car industry by positioning it at the heart of British electric vehicle manufacturing.

His official campaign slogan was 'A new future for the heart of Britain', although he said that his unofficial slogan was 'let's just get shit done'. Byrne campaigned on pledges such as "Protect Our Safety".

Despite saying to Sky News' Sophy Ridge that he would "beat Andy Street easily" on 18 April 2021, Byrne lost the election by over 8 percentage points as Street increased his majority.

Bullying 
In April 2022, Byrne was found to have bullied a former member of staff and was suspended from the House of Commons for two days after a 22-month investigation. The investigation began when a complaint was lodged with the Independent Complaints and Grievance Scheme (ICGS); the Independent Expert Panel found that Byrne ostracised a former assistant, David Barker, after a minor office dispute, specifically ignoring Barker for three months, including when Barker alerted Byrne that they had COVID-19. Kathryn Stone, the Parliamentary Standards Commissioner, described Byrne's behaviour as a "significant misuse of power"; and also found Byrne's decision to disable Barker's access to his parliamentary IT account had a "punitive" effect, stating that this was "disproportionate and amounted to malicious behaviour".

Following the publication of the panel's report, Byrne apologised and said that he was "profoundly sorry".

Personal life 
He married Sarah in 1998, with whom he has three children.

References

External links

 Liam Byrne official website

 Byrne's speech to Labour Party Conference 2011 hosted by YouTube on the party's official channel
 Profile: Liam Byrne BBC News, 2 November 2007
 The seat of power?, Nick Watson, The Politics Show, 5 July 2007

|-

|-

|-

|-

|-

|-

|-

|-

1970 births
Living people
Alumni of the Victoria University of Manchester
English businesspeople
English people of Irish descent
Chancellors of the Duchy of Lancaster
Harvard Business School alumni
Labour Party (UK) MPs for English constituencies
Labour Friends of Israel
Members of the Privy Council of the United Kingdom
People from Birmingham, West Midlands
People from Hertfordshire
People from Warrington
UK MPs 2001–2005
UK MPs 2005–2010
UK MPs 2010–2015
UK MPs 2015–2017
UK MPs 2017–2019
UK MPs 2019–present
Alumni of the Manchester Business School
N M Rothschild & Sons people
Chief Secretaries to the Treasury
Fulbright alumni